The Guernsey FA Cup is the foremost football cup competition for teams playing on the island of Guernsey.

2015-16
22 teams competing in 2015–16.

 Guernsey Rangers
 Manzur Vets
 Rihoy North (Vets)
 St Andrews
 Valencia
 Belgrave Wanderers

 Manzur Railway
 Centrals
 Elizabeth College
 Geomarine Rovers
 Rising Bet
 Utd FC

 St. Martins
 Vale Recreation F.C.
 Captains
 Northerners 
 Sylvans 

 Richmond Wanderers
 Manor Farm Saints
 Rocquaine Pirates
 Rovers
 Drainforce North (Railway)

Winners

2004-05 St. Martins
2005-06 Northerners
2006-07 Sylvans
2007-08 Northerners
2008-09 Belgrave Wanderers
2009-10 Guernsey Rangers

2010-11 Northerners
2011-12 St. Martins
2012-13 Belgrave Wanderers
2013-14 Guernsey Rangers
2014-15 St. Martins

2015-16 Northerners
2016-17 Vale Recreation Fc
2017-18 Northerners 
2018-19 Northerners 
2019-20 Abandoned Tournament 
2020-21 Sylvans

Sponsorship
2015-16 - AG Accounting

References

Football in Guernsey